"Later On" is a song recorded by American country music duo The Swon Brothers. The song was written by Nashville songwriters Ryan Hurd, Joey Hyde, and Justin Wilson, while production was handled by Mark Bright. It was released to digital retailers December 10, 2013, as the duo's first official single since signing to Arista Nashville, as well as the lead single from their self-titled debut studio album. It was released to country radio on March 3, 2014.

Critical reception
Taste of Country gave the song a positive review, describing it as a "burst of fresh air" in which the brothers deliver a fairly average vocal but prove themselves "capable storytellers" and "full of energy".

Music video
The music video was directed by Roman White and premiered in June 2014.

Chart performance
The song has sold  205,000 copies in the US as of October 2014.

Year-end charts

References

2013 debut singles
2013 songs
The Swon Brothers songs
Arista Nashville singles
Songs written by Ryan Hurd
Song recordings produced by Mark Bright (record producer)
Music videos directed by Roman White